Jagniówka  is a village in the administrative district of Gmina Borzęcin, within Brzesko County, Lesser Poland Voivodeship, in southern Poland.

The village has a population of 230.

References

Villages in Brzesko County